Golgi resident protein GCP60 is a protein that in humans is encoded by the ACBD3 gene.

Function 

The Golgi complex plays a key role in the sorting and modification of proteins exported from the endoplasmic reticulum. ACBD3 is involved in maintaining the Golgi structure by interacting with giantin, which affects the transport of protein. The protein encoded by this gene is involved in the maintenance of Golgi structure and function through its interaction with the integral membrane protein giantin. It may also be involved in the hormonal regulation of steroid formation.

Interactions 

ACBD3 has been shown to interact with GOLGB1.

References

External links

Further reading 

 
 
 
 
 
 
 

Human proteins